Emőke J.E. Szathmáry,  (born January 25, 1944, in Hungary) is a physical anthropologist, specializing in the study of human genetics. Dr. Szathmáry served as the 10th President and Vice-Chancellor of The University of Manitoba, 1996–2008.

Dr. Szathmáry's first administrative post was as chairman of the department of anthropology at McMaster University, a position she left to become Dean of the Faculty of Social Science at the University of Western Ontario.[Citation needed] She left this position to serve as provost and vice-president (academic) at McMaster University in Hamilton, Ontario, before going to her position at the University of Manitoba. Szathmáry was appointed a member of the Order of Canada in 2003.[Citation needed] In 2004, she was named one of Canada's top 100 most powerful women by the Women's Executive Network and the Richard Ivey School of Business.[Citation needed] In 2005, she was made a Fellow of the Royal Society of Canada. She was named also as a Distinguished Lecturer by the American Anthropological Association, which is the highest recognition given by the anthropological discipline for a lifetime of exemplary scholarship.[Citation needed]

Publications (partial list)
Prehistoric Mongoloid Dispersals, Takeru Akazawa (Editor), Emoke J. E. Szathmáry (Editor)
Out of Asia:  peopling the Americas and the Pacific, Journal of Pacific History, 1985, Robert Kirk, Emöke J. E. Szathmary, editors

 (obituary)

 contributor

Directorships (partial)
International Institute for Sustainable Development
Power Corporation of Canada, since 1999, Director, Member of Audit Committee and Member of Related Party & Conduct Review Committee 
Power Financial, since 1999
Great-West Lifeco since 2006
Can Credit Manag Found 2001-
Univ Arctic 2007-
St Boniface Gen Hosp, Manitoba 1996–2008
Advanced Foods and Materials Network
Canada Life Financial Corporation
Great-West Life Capital Trust
The Canada Life Assurance Company

References

External links
Order of Canada Citation

1944 births
Living people
Canadian university and college chief executives
Fellows of the Royal Society of Canada
Members of the Order of Canada
Members of the Order of Manitoba
Directors of Power Corporation of Canada
University of Toronto alumni
Hungarian emigrants to Canada
Naturalized citizens of Canada
Academic staff of the University of Western Ontario
Academic staff of McMaster University
Academic staff of the University of Manitoba
Fellows of the American Association for the Advancement of Science